Elke Silvia  Krystufek (born 1970) is an Austrian conceptual artist who lives and works in Berlin, Germany, and Vienna, Austria. She works in a variety of media including painting, sculpture, video and performance art.

Life
Krystufek studied at the Academy of Fine Arts Vienna in the early 1990s. Her work is informed by a history of Austrian artists – from Egon Schiele to the Vienna Actionists and Valie Export – who have explicitly explored sexuality in art.

Work
For her collection of images in the form of postcard-size photographs, titled “I am your mirror”, she took inspiration from the documentary work of photographer Nan Goldin and the “Atlas” by the German Painter Gerhard Richter. With the exhibition “Liquid Logic”, then direction of Peter Noever gave Krystufek access to all storages of the Museum of Applied Arts in Vienna and the MAK. She drew comparisons between a thematically arranged selection of objects from the museum collections that are rarely shown or on display.

 In 2009, she represented Austria at the 53rd Biennale of Venice in the Austrian Pavilion along with Dorit Margreiter, Fand ranziska and Lois Weinberger. In this show she dealt with the art-historical phenomenon of a nude male model painted by a heterosexual woman and the last film by Friedrich Wilhelm Murnau Tabu. Since her solo exhibition at Susanne Vielmetter Los Angeles Projects, the gallery gives access to part of the Elke Krystufek Archive on the subject of immigration. On 13 April 2011 her first theater play Hub premiered at the Garage X, Theater at Petersplatz in Vienna. On 27 May  her first public outdoor sculpture titled The Wall of Silence in the Schlosspark Grafenegg was destroyed on desire of Tassilo Metternich-Sándor.

Further reading
 Foundation Bawag  The rich visit the poor, the poor visit the rich. Vienna: Bawag Foundation, 2004. 
 Grosenick, Uta; Becker, Ilka. Women artists in the 20th and 21st century. Köln; New York: Taschen, 2001.
 Krystufek, Elke, Noever, Peter., Österreichisches Museum für Angewandte Kunst. (2006). Elke Krystufek: Liquid logic: the height of knowledge and the speed of thought. Ostfildern: Hatje Cantz, 2007.
 Krystufek, Elke. In the arms of luck. Genève, Suisse; Chatou, France: Centre genevois de gravure contemporaine; Maison Levanneur, Centre national de l'estampe et de l'art imprimé, 1999.
 Krystufek, Elke; Huck, Brigitte; Bienal Internacional de São Paulo. Economical love: Elke Krystufek, XXIV Bienal de São Paulo 1998.
 Sammlung Essl (2003). Nackt & Mobil - Elke Krystufek.

References

External links
 

Living people
1970 births
20th-century Austrian women artists
21st-century Austrian women artists
Austrian contemporary artists
Academy of Fine Arts Vienna alumni